Gipson is an unincorporated community in Scott County, in the U.S. state of Arkansas.

History
Gipson was founded ca. 1887, and named after James Gipson, a pioneer settler. A post office called Gipson was established in 1887, and remained in operation until 1902.

References

Unincorporated communities in Arkansas
Unincorporated communities in Scott County, Arkansas